Georg Braun (also Brunus, Bruin; 1541 – 10 March 1622) was a German topo-geographer. From 1572 to 1617, he edited the Civitates orbis terrarum, which contains 546 prospects, bird's-eye views and maps of cities from all around the world. He was the principal editor of the work, he acquired the tables, hired the artists, and wrote the texts. He died as an octogenarian in 1622, as the only survivor of the original team to witness the publication of volume VI in 1617.

Biography

Braun was born and died in Cologne. His principal profession was as a Catholic cleric. He spent thirty-seven years as canon and dean at the church, St. Maria ad Gradus, in Cologne. His six-volume work was inspired by Sebastian Münster's Cosmographia. In form and layout it resembles the 1570 Theatrum orbis terrarum by Abraham Ortelius, as Ortelius was interested in a complementary companion for the Theatrum.

The Braun publication set new standards in cartography for over 100 years. Frans Hogenberg (1535–1590, from Mechelen) created the tables for volumes I through IV, and Simon van den Neuwel created those for volumes V and VI. Other contributors were Joris Hoefnagel, Jacob Hoefnagel, cartographer Daniel Freese, and Heinrich Rantzau. Works by Jacob van Deventer, Sebastian Münster, and Johannes Stumpf were also used. Primarily European cities are depicted in the publication; however, Cairo Casablanca  and Mexico City as well as Cuzco on one sheet are also included in volume I, whereas Tunis is featured in volume II.

Sources
 James Elliot (1987), The City in Maps: Urban Mapping to 1900, British Library London, 
 Ronald Vere Tooley (1979), Tooley's Dictionary of Mapmakers, 
 Leo Bagrow, Abraham Ortelius: A. Ortelii Catalogus Cartographorum, J. Perthes (1928) (link broken)

Gallery

References

External links

 
 
 Wolfgang Bruhn: Alte deutsche Städtebilder : 24 farb. Blätter / Georg Braun; Franz Hogenberg, J. Asmus, Leipzig (1938)
 Georg Braun, Franz Hogenberg: Old European Cities: 16th century city maps and texts, with a description by Ruthardt Oehme of early map-making techniques, London (1965)
 Civitates orbis terrarum (description and high-res scans)
 Civitates orbis terrarum - Braun and Hogenberg
 Braun Hogenberg Map Collection at University of South Carolina
 Georg Braun maps depicting Europe and Mexico at the John Carter Brown Library

1541 births
1622 deaths
Scientists from Cologne
German geographers
16th-century cartographers
17th-century cartographers
German cartographers
16th-century German Roman Catholic priests
17th-century German  Roman Catholic priests
16th-century German writers
16th-century German male writers
Clergy from Cologne